Brendan Lowry (born 11 July 1959) is an Irish former Gaelic footballer who played for his local club Ferbane and at senior level for the Offaly county team from 1981 until 1992. Lowry scored 0–3 to help his team to victory in the 1982 All-Ireland Senior Football Championship Final, the most recent occasion that Offaly won the Sam Maguire Cup. His brothers Mick and Seán also played in the 1982 All-Ireland SFC winning side.

Lowry managed the Westmeath senior team between 1997 and 2000. He received a controversial six-month ban (which was later lifted) after protesting against a tackle on Dessie Dolan in the 2000 O'Byrne Cup final.

His son Shane is a professional golfer, who won the 2009 Irish Open and the 2019 Open Championship at Portrush.

References

1959 births
Living people
Ferbane Gaelic footballers
Gaelic football forwards
Brendan
Offaly inter-county Gaelic footballers
Winners of one All-Ireland medal (Gaelic football)